Siti Nurhaliza is one of the best-selling and most well-known artists in the Malay Archipelago, Nusantara region. and Southeast Asia. She has been Malaysia's most award-winning artist when her record was included in the Malaysia Book of Records in 2001 & 2004 and remained the record holder till now. To date, she has won more than 300 local awards as well as international awards.

She is a multiple record holders for various awards and accolades, so far she has received – 42 Anugerah Industri Muzik awards, 31 Anugerah Bintang Popular awards, 28 Anugerah Planet Muzik awards, 22 Anugerah Juara Lagu awards, four MTV Asia Awards, three World Music Awards, two Anugerah Musik Indonesia (Indonesian Music Awards) and the holder of five records in the Malaysia Book of Records.

Music

Anugerah ERA (ERA Awards)
First organised in 2001, Anugerah ERA is an award ceremony that was then hosted by one of Malaysia's radio companies, Era FM annually from 2001 until 2007. The show was somehow absent for the years of 2008 and 2009. Artistes were voted on through SMS, phone call, and also through online and manual form, which could be faxed or mailed to their head office. In her debut in the award in 2001, she won all the categories for which she was nominated, which was five out of ten categories overall. She also holds the record for the highest number of wins for the category of Vokal Wanita Pilihan (Best Choice for Female Vocalist) winning five times.

|-
|rowspan="5"|2001
|rowspan="1"|"Pandang-Pandang Jeling-Jeling"duet with Tan Sri S.M. Salim
|rowspan="1"|Best Choice Ethnic Song
|
|-
|rowspan="2"|"Percayalah"||Best Choice Pop Song||
|-
|Best Choice Music Video
|
|-
|rowspan="1"| ||Best Choice for Duo/Group VocalistA||
|-
|rowspan="1"| ||Best Choice for Female Vocalist||
|-
|rowspan="4"|2002
|rowspan="1"|"Kurik-Kundi"
|rowspan="1"|Best Choice Ethnic/Global
|
|-
|rowspan="2"|"Nirmala"||Best Choice Ethnic/Global Song||
|-
|Best Choice Music Video
|
|-
|rowspan="1"| ||Best Choice for Female Vocalist||
|-
|rowspan="5"|2003
|rowspan="1"|"Badarsila"
|rowspan="1"|Best Choice Ethnic/Global Song
|
|-
|rowspan="2"|"Bukan Cinta Biasa"||Best Choice Music Video||
|-
|Best Choice Pop Song
|
|-
|rowspan="1"|"Ku Milikmu"||Best Choice Music Video||
|-
|rowspan="1"| ||Best Choice for Female Vocalist||
|-
|rowspan="4"|2004
|rowspan="1"|"Bergendingdandong"duet with Tan Sri S.M. Salim
|rowspan="1"|Best Choice Ethnic/Global Song
|
|-
|rowspan="2"|"Dialah Di Hati"||Best Choice Music Video||
|-
|Best Choice Pop Song
|
|-
|rowspan="1"| ||Best Choice for Female Vocalist||
|-
|rowspan="4"|2005
|rowspan="1"|"Lagu Rindu"
|rowspan="1"|Best Choice Ethnic/Global Song
|
|-
|rowspan="2"|"Seindah Biasa"||Best Choice Music Video||
|-
|Best Choice Pop Song
|
|-
|rowspan="1"| ||Best Choice for Female Vocalist||
|-
|rowspan="3"|2006
|rowspan="1"|"Biarlah Rahsia"
|rowspan="1"|Best Choice Pop Song
|
|-
|rowspan="1"| ||Best Choice for Female Vocalist||
|-
|rowspan="1"| ||Best Choice for Duo/Group VocalistB||
|-
|rowspan="2"|2007
|rowspan="1"|"Pastikan"
|rowspan="1"|Best Choice Pop Song
|
|-
|rowspan="1"| ||Best Choice for Female Vocalist||
|-

 A She shared the award with Tan Sri S.M. Salim.
 B She was nominated with Too Phat.

Anugerah Industri Muzik (Music Industry Awards)
Anugerah Industri Muzik (AIM) is an annual event similar to Grammy Awards which recognised Malaysia's finest artists. Since her participation in 1997 with her debut single, Jerat Percintaan, she has won 42 awards, where she holds the record of highest frequency of winning Persembahan Vokal Terbaik di Dalam Album/Lagu (Wanita) (Best Vocal Performance in an Album/Song (Female)) winning 13 times out of 17 years of participation with some of the years with multiple nominations in the same category. She also holds the record of winning the most in the category of Album Terbaik (Best Album), winning seven times out of nine nominations.

The year indicates the ceremony year, awarding against the previous year's works.

|-
|rowspan="2"|1997 || || Best New Artist || 
|-
|| "Jerat Percintaan" || Best Song || 
|-
|rowspan="3"|1998
|rowspan="2"|Siti Nurhaliza I
|rowspan="1"|Best Pop Album
|
|-
|Best Vocal Performance in an Album (Female)
|
|-
|"Aku Cinta Padamu"
|Best Song
|
|-
|rowspan="3"|1999
|rowspan="3"|Adiwarna
|rowspan="1"|Best Pop Album
|
|-
|Best Vocal Performance in an Album (Female)
|
|-
|Best Album
|
|-
|rowspan="7"|2000
|rowspan="2"|Pancawarna
|rowspan="1"|Best Pop Album
|
|-
|Best Vocal Performance in an Album (Female)
|
|-
|rowspan="2"|Seri Balas (duet album with Noraniza Idris) || Best Pop Ethnic Album || 
|-
|Best Album
|
|-
|rowspan="1"|"Hati Kama" (duet single with Noraniza Idris)|| Best Song || 
|-
|rowspan="1"|"Nian Di Hati"|| Best Song || 
|-
|rowspan="1"| ||Kembara Award||
|-
|rowspan="4"|2001
|rowspan="3"|Sahmura
|rowspan="1"|Best Vocal Performance in an Album (Female)
|
|-
|Best Pop Ethnic Album
|
|-
|Best Album
|
|-
|rowspan="1"|"Balqis"||Best Musical Arrangement in a Song|| 
|-
|rowspan="5"|2002
|rowspan="2"|2001 Mega Concert Album
|rowspan="1"|Best Vocal Performance in an Album (Female)
|
|-
|Best Pop Album
|
|-
|rowspan="2"|Safa||Best Vocal Performance in an Album (Female)||
|-
|Best Pop Album
|
|-
|rowspan="1"|"Percayalah"||Best Song|| 
|-
|rowspan="6"|2003
|rowspan="2"|Konsert Live Untukmu Sudir
|rowspan="1"|Best Vocal Performance in an Album (Female)
|
|-
|Best Pop Album
|
|-
|rowspan="2"|Sanggar Mustika||Best Vocal Performance in an Album (Female)||
|-
|Best Pop Ethnic Album
|
|-
|rowspan="1"|"Merisik Khabar" (from album Konsert Live Untukmu Sudir)||Best Musical Arrangement in a Song||
|-
|rowspan="1"|"Nirmala"||Best Song||
|-
|rowspan="6"|2004
|rowspan="4"|E.M.A.S
|rowspan="1"|Best Vocal Performance in an Album (Female)
|
|-
|Best Pop Album
|
|-
|Best Album
|
|-
|Best Album Cover
|
|-
|rowspan="1"|"Bukan Cinta Biasa"||Best Musical Arrangement in a Song||
|-
|rowspan="1"| ||Kembara Award||
|-
|rowspan="9"|2005
|rowspan="3"|Prasasti Seni
|rowspan="1"|Best Vocal Performance in an Album (Female)
|
|-
|Best Album Cover
|
|-
|Best Pop Album
|
|-
|rowspan="1"|Siti Nurhaliza Live In Concert 2004||Best Vocal Performance in an Album (Female)||
|-
|rowspan="1"|"Bagaikan Sakti" (duet single with M. Nasir)||Best Musical Arrangement in a Song ||
|-
|rowspan="2"|"Dialah Di Hati"||Best Musical Arrangement in a Song || 
|-
|Best Song
|
|-
|rowspan="1"|"Seindah Biasa"||Best Musical Arrangement in a Song||
|-
|rowspan="1"| ||Kembara Award||
|-
|rowspan="1"|2006
|rowspan="1"|Siti Nurhaliza in Concert, Royal Albert Hall, London
|rowspan="1"|Best Vocal Performance in an Album (Female)
|
|-
|rowspan="5"|2007
|rowspan="4"|Transkripsi
|rowspan="1"|Best Vocal Performance in an Album (Female)
|
|-
|Best Album Cover
|
|-
|Best Pop Album
|
|-
|Best Album
|
|-
|rowspan="1"|"Bisakah"||Best Video||
|-
|rowspan="8"|2008
|rowspan="3"|Hadiah Daripada Hati
|rowspan="1"|Best Vocal Performance in an Album (Female)
|
|-
|Best Album Cover
|
|-
|Best Pop Album
|
|-
|rowspan="1"|"Cintamu"||Best Musical Arrangement in a Song (Bahasa Malaysia)||
|-
|rowspan="1"|"Hati"||Best Musical Arrangement in a Song (Bahasa Malaysia)||
|-
|rowspan="1"|"Menanti Pasti"||Best Song||
|-
|rowspan="2"|"Sekian Lama"||Best Musical Arrangement in a Song (Bahasa Malaysia)||
|-
|Best Song
|
|-
|rowspan="7"|2009
|rowspan="2"|Lentera Timur
|rowspan="1"|Best Pop Ethnic Album
|
|-
|Best Album
|
|-
|rowspan="2"|"Di Kayangan Kita"||Best Vocal Performance in an Album (Female)||
|-
|Best Pop Ethnic Song
|
|-
|rowspan="2"|"Di Taman Teman"||Best Vocal Performance in an Album (Female)||
|-
|Best Musical Arrangement in a Song
|
|-
|rowspan="1"|"Pada Cintanya"||Best Musical Arrangement in a Song||
|-
|rowspan="5"|2010
|rowspan="1"|CTKD: Canda, Tangis, Ketawa, Duka (duet album with Krisdayanti)
|rowspan="1"|Best Pop Album
|
|-
|rowspan="1"|Tahajjud Cinta||Best Pop Album||
|-
|rowspan="1"|"Amarah" (duet single with Krisdayanti)||Best Vocal Performance in a Song (Group)||
|-
|rowspan="1"|"Ku Percaya Ada Cinta"||Best Vocal Performance in a Song (Female)||
|-
|rowspan="1"|"Sebagai Teman" (duet song with Krisdayanti)||Best Musical Arrangement in a Song||
|-
|rowspan="2"|2012
| "I Cry Out"
| Best Vocal Performance in a Song (Female)
| 
|-
| "Stand Up"
| Best Local English Song
| 
|-
|rowspan="1"|2013
| "Galau"
| Best Vocal Performance in a Song (Female)
| 
|-
|rowspan="8"|2014
|rowspan="3"|Fragmen
|rowspan="1"|Best Album
|
|-
|Best Album Cover
|
|-
|Best Engineered Album
|
|-
|rowspan="1"|Konsert Lentera Timur Dato' Siti Nurhaliza Bersama Orkestra Tradisional Malaysia
|rowspan="1"|Best Engineered Album
|
|-
|rowspan="2"|"Lebih Indah"
|rowspan="1"|Best Vocal Performance in a Song (Female)
|
|-
|Best Musical Arrangement in a Song
|
|-
|rowspan="1"|"Jaga Dia Untukku"
|rowspan="1"|Best Pop Song
|
|-
|rowspan="1"|"Popaleh Weh"
|rowspan="1"|Best Pop Ethnic Song
|
|-
|rowspan="9"|2016
|rowspan="1"|"Jaga Dia Untukku" (Live from Unplugged)
|rowspan="2"|Best Musical Arrangement in a Song
|
|-
|rowspan="3"|"Menatap dalam Mimpi"
|
|-
|rowspan="1"|Best Pop Song
|
|-
|rowspan="1"|Best Vocal Performance in a Song (Female)
|
|-
|rowspan="2"|"Mikraj Cinta"
|rowspan="1"|Best Nasyid Song
|
|-
|rowspan="1"|Best Song
|
|-
|rowspan="2"|Dato' Siti Nurhaliza Unplugged
|rowspan="1"|Best Engineered Album
|
|-
|rowspan="1"|Best Album
|
|-
| Herself
|rowspan="1"|Choice Malaysian Artiste
|

Anugerah Juara Lagu (Song Champion Awards)
Anugerah Juara Lagu (AJL) is a yearly event which recognised the musical composition of a song based on the collaborations of three parties - lyricist, composer and the artiste. Its weekly programme will gather singles and songs nominations from various artistes where they will compete till their songs are included as the finalists before ultimately nominated to be judged by professional judges. From 1986 until 1991, the finalists for the final were chosen based on monthly winners, and from 1992 until 2008, the songs were separated into three main categories - Ballad, Irama Malaysia and Ethnic Creative Song and also Pop Rock. However, from 2009 onwards, all of the categories were revamped and all final 12 finalists were made to compete against each other with no category limitations. Siti Nurhaliza holds three records of AJL - most overall wins (three times), highest number of songs and singles participating in the finals (18 songs) and artistes with the highest frequency of winning Persembahan Terbaik (Best Performance) with wins five times. In addition, her winning performance of Cindai during the final of AJL in 1998 won the title Champion of Champions where all past winners from 1986 till 2004 were voted on by the viewers in 2006.

|-
|rowspan="3"|1996
|rowspan="3"|"Jerat Percintaan"
|rowspan="1"|Best Ballad Song
|
|-
|Best Performance
|
|-
|Overall Winner
|
|-
|rowspan="2"|1997
|rowspan="2"|"Aku Cinta Padamu"
|rowspan="1"|Best Ballad Song
|
|-
|Best Performance
|
|-
|rowspan="4"|1998
|rowspan="1"|"Bisikan Asmara"
|rowspan="1"|Best Pop Rock Song
|
|-
|rowspan="2"|"Cindai"|| Best Irama Malaysia and Ethnic Creative Song || 
|-
|Overall Winner
|
|-
|rowspan="1"|"Wajah Kekasih"|| Best Ballad Song || 
|-
|rowspan="3"|1999
|rowspan="1"|"Hati Kama" (duet single with Noraniza Idris)
|rowspan="1"|Best Irama Malaysia and Ethnic Creative Song
|
|-
|rowspan="1"|"Purnama Merindu"|| Best Ballad Song || 
|-
|rowspan="1"|"Satu Hati Dua Jiwa"|| Best Pop Rock Song || 
|-
|rowspan="4"|2000
|rowspan="2"|"Balqis"
|rowspan="1"|Best Irama Malaysia and Ethnic Creative Song
|
|-
|Overall Winner
|
|-
|rowspan="1"|"Kau Kekasihku"|| Best Ballad Song || 
|-
|rowspan="1"|"Nian Di Hati"|| Best Ballad Song || 
|-
|rowspan="4"|2001
|rowspan="1"|"Engkau Bagaikan Permata"
|rowspan="1"|Best Pop Rock Song
|
|-
|rowspan="1"|"Percayalah"|| Best Ballad Song || 
|-
|rowspan="2"|"Ya Maulai"|| Best Irama Malaysia and Ethnic Creative Song || 
|-
|Best Performance
|
|-
|rowspan="3"|2002
|rowspan="1"|"Bicara Manis Menghiris Kalbu"
|rowspan="1"|Best Ballad Song
|
|-
|rowspan="2"|"Nirmala"|| Best Irama Malaysia and Ethnic Creative Song || 
|-
|Best Performance
|
|-
|rowspan="2"|2003
|rowspan="2"|"Ku Milikmu"
|rowspan="1"|Best Pop Rock Song
|
|-
|Best Performance
|
|-
|rowspan="1"|2005
|rowspan="1"|"Cindai"
|rowspan="1"|Viewers Choice Song
|
|-
|rowspan="1"|2007
|rowspan="1"|"Destinasi Cinta"
|rowspan="1"|Best Pop Rock Song
|
|-
|rowspan="3"|2015
|rowspan="1"|Herself
|rowspan="1"|AJL Icon (Anugerah Ikon AJL) 
|
|-
|rowspan="1"|"Cindai"
|rowspan="2"|Qu Puteh Diva
|
|-
|rowspan="1"|"Jerat Percintaan"
|
|-
|rowspan="2"|2020
|rowspan="2"|"Anta Permana"A
|rowspan="1"|Best Song 
| 3rd place
|-
|rowspan="1"|Setel Fans Choice Awards (Anugerah Pilihan Peminat Setel)
|
|-
|rowspan="4"|2021
|rowspan="2"|"7 Nasihat"B
|rowspan="1"|Best Song Second Week - Semi Final Muzik-Muzik 35 
|
|-
|rowspan="1"|Best Song
|
|-
|rowspan="1"|"Aku Bidadari Syurgamu"C
|rowspan="1"|Best Song 
|
|-

 A The song was performed by Bob and Siti as featuring artist.
 B The song was performed by Shiha Zikir.
 A The song was performed by Aishah.

Anugerah Planet Muzik (Planet Music Awards)
Anugerah Planet Muzik (APM) is an annual event with the collaborations of three different countries - Indonesia, Malaysia and Singapore. Each year, different country will play host where it will gather all artists from the trio participating countries to compete for two main parts of the categories - Best Achievement (judged by professional judges from all three countries) and Most Popular (voted by voters from all participating countries and through Short Message Service (SMS) and forms in magazines). Since her participation in the very first version of APM, she has won 20 awards - nine times in a row for the category of Most Popular Female Artiste and five times winning the category of Best Female Artiste. In 2009, she was chosen by voters from all participating countries, for a new category as Regional Most Popular Artiste.

 A She shared the award with Krisdayanti.
 B APM counts this single award as two, for both "Regional Most Popular Artiste" and "Regional Most Popular Artiste (For More than a Decade)".

Bintang HMI
Bintang Hiburan Minggu Ini (Bintang HMI) is a singing competition organised by RTM in search of new singers for the Malaysian music industry. In 1995, Siti competed in this competition before being ultimately revealed as the winner. During this competition, she met Adnan Abu Hassan, whom she received tutelage from during the competition. She also received offers of four singing contracts from four different labels, before ultimately choosing Suria Records, at the age of 16.

|-
| 1995
| 
| Bintang HMI 1995
|
|-

Hits 1
Formerly known as Hits 1, Gah 1 is an annual competition where the top ten finalists will be competing against each other in the final. First broadcast by RTM in 2004, it bears a minor similarity with the concept of Anugerah Juara Lagu where the final ten contestants are placed in the finals based on weekly votes from viewers before ultimately judged by the professionals during the final.

|-
| rowspan="3"|2004
| rowspan="3"|"Lagu Rindu"
| Best Song
| 
|-
| Best Performance
| 
|-
| Most Popular SongA
| 
|-
| 2007
| "Bisakah"
| Best Song
|
|-

 A Voted by viewers through SMS.

Mentor
Mentor is a singing competition by TV3 where successful artistes will recruit one protégé each to teach and train them to become a better singer. Siti participated in this competition twice where in 2005 with Mohd. Fahmi Hj. Jaafar (Fahmi) and in 2006 with Siti Khadijah Hassan (Kat) where they end up winning the second runner up overall.

|-
|rowspan="1"|2006
|rowspam="1"|
|rowspan="1"|Mentor (Second Season)
|
|-

Popularity and commerciality

Anugerah Bintang Popular Berita Harian (Berita Harian's Most Popular Star Awards)
An annual event that was launched in 1987 which was known as Anugerah Pelakon/Penyanyi Popular (Popular Actor/Singer Award), Anugerah Bintang Popular Berita Berita Harian (ABPBH) is an award ceremony that recognises the most popular artistes of the year. The award is a yearly ceremony organised by one of Malaysia's newspapers, Berita Harian with results entirely based on votes cast by readers. For this award, Siti holds three records - highest number of wins in the category Artis Wanita Paling Popular (Most Popular Female Artiste) with 13 consecutive wins since her debut, and highest winning overall for Bintang Paling Popular (Most Popular Star) winning seven times, and the highest number of awards won overall which is 23 awards. In 2012, she received her 23rd award from ABPBH, a special award by the organiser for their Silver Jubilee celebration.

|-
|rowspan="4"|1996
|rowspan="4"|
|rowspan="1"|Most Popular Teen Artiste
|
|-
|Most Popular TV Entertainer
|
|-
|Most Popular Female Singer
|
|-
|Most Popular Star
|
|-
|rowspan="2"|1997–98
|rowspan="2"|
|rowspan="1"|Most Popular Female Singer
|
|-
|Most Popular Star
|
|-
|rowspan="2"|1998–99
|rowspan="2"|
|rowspan="1"|Most Popular Female Singer
|
|-
|Most Popular Star
|
|-
|rowspan="2"|2000
|rowspan="2"|
|rowspan="1"|Most Popular Female Singer
|
|-
|Most Popular Star
|
|-
|rowspan="2"|2001
|rowspan="2"|
|rowspan="1"|Most Popular Female Singer
|
|-
|Most Popular Star
|
|-
|rowspan="1"|2002
|rowspan="1"|
|rowspan="1"|Most Popular Female Singer
|
|-
|rowspan="1"|2003
|rowspan="1"|
|rowspan="1"|Most Popular Female Singer
|
|-
|rowspan="2"|2004
|rowspan="2"|
|rowspan="1"|Most Popular Female Singer
|
|-
|Most Popular Star
|
|-
|rowspan="1"|2005
|rowspan="1"|
|rowspan="1"|Most Popular Female Artiste
|
|-
|rowspan="1"|2006
|rowspan="1"|
|rowspan="1"|Most Popular Female Artiste
|
|-
|rowspan="1"|2007
|rowspan="1"|
|rowspan="1"|Most Popular Female Artiste
|
|-
|rowspan="1"|2008
|rowspan="1"|
|rowspan="1"|Most Popular Female Artiste
|
|-
|rowspan="2"|2009
|rowspan="2"|
|rowspan="1"|Most Popular Female Singer
|
|-
|Most Popular Star
|
|-
|rowspan="1"|2011
|rowspan="1"|
|rowspan="1"|Anugerah Seri Perak (Special Category)
|
|-

Best Dressed Artist
The organizers of the awards ceremony also presented awards to both designer and artist who has created and worn respectively the Best Dress during the award ceremonial event. The artist's dress designer will be awarded with the Most Popular Fashion Designer award. For the Best Dressed Artist category, there are two subcategories, which are Best Dressed Artist (judged by professional judges) and Most Voted Best Dressed Artist (voted by readers and online voting). For three years in a row, from 2008 until 2010, Siti hired the same designer duo, Rizman Ruzaini who won three times in a row the Most Popular Designer with the artist who worn the design was awarded Most Voted Best Dressed Artist. 

Online Category
Since the 25th editions of the awards ceremony, the organizers also presented other category for the awards ceremony.  The online category was based on online voting.

 #FANtastik (Fan club Awards)
FANtastik is an event that involved artist's fan clubs, this event is in conjunction with Anugerah Bintang Popular Berita Harian (ABPBH) Ke-31 (31st Berita Harian's Most Popular Star Awards).

Anugerah K-20 Karaoke Popular 
Anugerah K-20 Karaoke Popular (K-20 Popular Karaoke Awards) or also known as Anugerah Lagu Karaoke Popular Red Box (Red Box Most Popular Karaoke Song Awards) is an award recognise of the contributions and talent in the entertainment industry.  This award organized by Red Box and the winner of the award was choosing by most plays song by customers at Red Box Karaoke Malaysia.

|-
|rowspan="1"|2015
|rowspan="1"|"Jaga Dia Untukku"
|rowspan="1"| 10 Lagu Berbahasa Melayu Paling Popular 2014
| 9th place
|-

Anugerah K Neway 
Anugerah Lagu Melayu Paling Popular Neway (Neway Most Popular Malay Song Awards) is an award to recognise of the contributions and talent in the entertainment industry. This award organised by Neway Karaoke Box Malaysia and makes its debut in 2013. The winner of the award was choosing by 12 most plays song by customers at Neway Karaoke Box Malaysia. In 2014, the organiser was organising the Anugerah K Neway 2014 (Neway K Awards). This time the awards have 8 categories and the winner will take from most plays song by customers (60%) and fan vote (40%). However, in view of the fatal tragedy of MH17 and MH370, the awards show had cancel as part of the respect to the nation who is mourning over the tragedy.  

|-
|rowspan="1"|2013
|rowspan="1"|"Muara Hati"
|rowspan="1"|Neway Most Popular Malay Song
| 5th place
|-
|rowspan="1"|2014
|rowspan="1"|"Galau"
|rowspan="1"|Karaoke Best Female Artiste (Artis Wanita Terbaik Karaoke)
|Not Held
|-
|rowspan="1"|2015
|rowspan="1"|Herself
|rowspan="1"|Karaoke Best Female Artiste (Artis Wanita Terbaik Karaoke)
| Gold
|-

Anugerah Pilihan Online(APO)
Anugerah Pilihan Online 2016 or APO2016 was organized by The Star Online and Suria FM. The award gives an opportunity to the public to choose a winner.  The winners will be decided by 70% online votes and remaining 30% will be decided by a panel of judges. The awards aim to recognize local personalities in all fields of entertainment, sports, fashion and business. It also to highlight those who are actively use the advantages of social media and cyberspace. 

|-
|rowspan="3"|2016
|rowspan="3"|Herself
|rowspan="1"|Wanita Anggun Pilihan Dnars (Dnars Favorite Choice of Beautiful Women)
|
|-
|Ikon Fesyen Pilihan Online (Online Favorite Choice of Fashion Icon) 
|
|-
|Penyanyi Wanita Terhebat Pilihan Online (Online Favorite Choice of Greatest Female Singer) 
|
|-

Anugerah Pilihan Pembaca Media Hiburan (Media Hiburan's Readers' Choice Awards)
Anugerah Pilihan Pembaca Media Hiburan (APPMH) or formerly known as - Anugerah Media Hiburan, Anugerah Ceria Media Hiburan, Anugerah Personaliti Pilihan Pembaca Media Hiburan or Anugerah Personaliti Hiburan is an event where it recognised the artistes based on their aesthethical values. The event is under the responsibility of one of Malaysia's celebrity magazine, Media Hiburan.

|-
|rowspan="1"|1997
|rowspan="1"|
|rowspan="1"|Most Beautiful Artiste
|
|-
|rowspan="2"|1999
|rowspan="2"|
|rowspan="1"|Most Sensationally Beautiful Artiste
|
|-
|Most Sensational Artiste
|
|-
|rowspan="3"|2000
|rowspan="3"|
|rowspan="1"|Most Sensational Ballad Singer
|
|-
|Most Sensational Pop Ethnic Singer
|
|-
|Most Sensationally Beautiful Artiste
|
|-
|rowspan="1"|2001
|rowspan="1"|
|rowspan="1"|Most Beautiful Artiste
|
|-
|rowspan="2"|2002
|rowspan="2"|
|rowspan="1"|Best Female Artiste
|
|-
|Special Award
|
|-
|rowspan="1"|2004
|rowspan="1"|
|rowspan="1"|Most Beautiful Artiste
|
|-
|rowspan="4"|2009
|rowspan="4"|
|rowspan="1"|Female Artiste With A Flawless Skin
|
|-
|Most Fashionable Female Artiste
|
|-
|Most Beautiful Artiste
|
|-
|Special Award
|
|-
|rowspan="3"|2011
|rowspan="3"|
|rowspan="1"|Icon Award
|
|-
|Favourite Celebrity
|
|-
|Female Artiste With A Flawless Skin
|
|-

Nickelodeon Kid's Choice Awards
First organised in 2004, Siti Nurhaliza is the first ever winner of the Malaysian version of Nickelodeon Kid's Choice Awards where she was voted by children and young teenagers as their favourite role model. She tied with Mawi for the most winning of the same category of Wannabe Award but she was chosen as the Most Nominated Artiste for that category with three nominations in 2006.

|-
|rowspan="1"|2004
|rowspan="1"|
|rowspan="1"|Wannabe Award
|
|-
|rowspan="1"|2005
|rowspan="1"|
|rowspan="1"|Wannabe Award
|
|-
|rowspan="2"|2006
|rowspan="2"|
|rowspan="1"|Wannabe Award
|
|-
|Most Nominated Artiste
|
|-

Shout! Awards
Shout! Awards was first organised by 8TV in 2009 as a mean for the viewers and fans to vote for their favourite artistes for 15 different categories with finalists that have been chosen by a panel of professional judges where Siti was nominated for two categories. One new category was added in 2010 edition, which is the Mobile Artiste of The Year award.

|-
|rowspan="2"|2009
|rowspan="2"|
|rowspan="1"|Popstar Award
|
|-
|Power Vocal Award
|
|-
|rowspan="2"|2010
|rowspan="2"|
|rowspan="1"|Popstar AwardA
|
|-
|Power Vocal AwardA
|
|-
|rowspan="1"|2012
|rowspan="1"|
|rowspan="1"|Popstar Award
|

 A She is nominated with Krisdayanti.

International accolades

MTV Asia Awards
Since its inaugural debut in 2002, MTV Asia has nominated Siti for the category of Favourite Artiste Malaysia five times, where she won four times consecutively from 2002 till 2005. She holds the record of the most winning, second to Stefanie Sun who has won six times. She also has been making performances for the awards thrice - 2003, 2004 and 2005.

International awards
Anugerah Hitz Minggu Ini (Hitz Minggu Ini Awards)
Anugerah Hitz Minggu Ini organized by Singapore radio Ria 89.7FM. This awards were part of the end of the Hitz Minggu Ini segment for year 2018.

Anugerah Musik Indonesia (Indonesian Music Awards)
Anugerah Musik Indonesia also known as AMI or colloquially AMI Awards is an annual Indonesian major music awards. They have been compared to the American Grammy Awards.

Big Apple Music Awards
The Big Apple Music Awards Foundation (BAMA) is a unique, multinational membership-based association composed of music industry professionals, musicians, producers, engineers and other creative and technical recording professionals who are dedicated to improving the quality of life and the cultural condition for Central Asian, Caucasian and Middle Eastern music and its makers both inside and outside the United States.

Daf BAMA Music Awards
First organized in 2015, Daf BAMA Music Awards is an international multicultural music award show that organized by Daf Entertainment based in Hamburg, Germany. This awards ceremony was recognize and honour the artists from all over the world and aim to unite the world with a beautiful music.

Dahsyatnya Awards
Dahsyatnya Awards is an award by Rajawali Citra Televisi Indonesia (RCTI), an Indonesian TV station, for the outstanding songs, albums, and artists based on the audience's vote.

 Golden Panther Music Awards
The Golden Panther Music Awards is an international awards show that was present to the world's best-selling artists from each major territory in multiple musical genres, including Pop/Rock, Alternative Rock, Country, Rap/Hip-Hop, Soul/R&B, Adult Contemporary, Contemporary Inspirational, Latin, EDM and Soundtrack. 

Indonesian Box Office Movie Awards (IBOMA)
Indonesian Box Office Movie Awards (IBOMA) is an award by SCTV, an Indonesian TV station, for appreciation to the figures that have been directly involved in the Indonesia film industries. 

Intuned Music Awards
Intuned Music Awards is an online award event where fans can cast their votes online for their favourites. For the inaugural event, with over 132 000 votes cast, Siti Nurhaliza won all seven awards out of seven nominations that she received.

McMillan Woods Global Awards
Siti Nurhaliza was the first Malaysian artist received for this award category. The award before was received by Hong Kong celebrities Ron Ng Cheuk Hei and an actress Ellane Kwong.

SCTV Music Awards
SCTV Music Awards is an award by SCTV, an Indonesian TV station, for the most popular songs, albums, and artists based on the audience's vote.

Silet Awards
Silet Awards is an annual award from Indonesian television program that broadcast on RCTI. This award to honour celebrities that become a part of this Silet television program. 

Singapore Music Awards

Shorty Awards
The Shorty Awards "honor the best of social media, recognizing the people and organizations producing real-time short form content across Twitter, Facebook, Tumblr, YouTube, Foursquare, and the rest of the social Web". According to the award rules, the six nominees with the highest rank in a selected Featured Categories at the end of the nomination period are the Shorty Awards finalists in that category. The most popular, relevant, and interesting categories will be submitted to The academy for judging. The academy does not choose a winner in every category.  

The Muslim World Rania Award
The Muslim World Rania Award is given to individuals who have made outstanding contributions to the Muslim world in their respective professions by the Organisation of Islamic Cooperation (OIC) every year. The awards presented during a special ceremony in conjunction with the annual international trade event, the Muslim World Biz.

World Music Awards
The World Music Awards is an international awards show founded in 1989 that annually honours recording artists based on worldwide sales figures provided by the International Federation of the Phonographic Industry (IFPI). The awards show is conducted under the patronage of Albert II, Prince of Monaco and is based in Monte-Carlo, Monaco. On 13 December 2012 she was nominated for the first time for World Music Awards 2012 in two categories, which will be held in Miami, United States. However, the awards ceremony were postponed from 22 December 2012 to a later announced date.

YouTube Creator Awards
YouTube Creator Awards also known as YouTube Play Buttons, are an awards from YouTube that serves to recognize its most popular channels based on a channel's subscriber count. There are five types of awards, The Silver Creator Award (100,000 subscribers), The Gold Creator Award (1 million subscribers), The Diamond Creator Award (10 million subscribers), The Custom Creator Award (50 million subscribers) and The Red Diamond Creator Award (100 million subscribers).

International singing competitions
South Pacific International Song and Singing Competition

Shanghai Asia Music Festival
Asia New Singer Competition (simplified Chinese: 亚洲新人歌手大赛; traditional Chinese: 亞洲新人歌手大賽) is a singing competition established by Shanghai Cultural Development Foundation in Shanghai, China, featuring younger and relatively unestablished contestants from many Asian countries, although contestants from Europe and Oceania have also participated and won awards.

The International Song Contest - The Global Sound
The International Song Contest was started in June 2012. The goal of the contest was to get countries together and showcase the importance of what music and culture by showcasing the various talents the world has. The contest is completely online voting for the final contestant and the winner will be vote by the host country juries. She was joined for the 7th and 14th edition of International Song Contest The Global Sound.

Voice of Asia
Voice of Asia (Kazakh: Азия Дауысы, Azïya Dawısı; Russian: Голос Азии, Golos Azii) is a music festival, held annually in Almaty, Kazakhstan. Dozens of acts from all over Asia each take the stage over a period of several days and nights to perform their hit songs.

Tv Shows
Asian Television Awards
Inaugurated in 1996, Asian Television Awards (ATA) is an award ceremony which is to recognise achievement by Asian television productions be it in performance, programming or even production. The winners are selected by a panel of more than 50 judges from the Asian region, where the results are tabulated and audited by an auditing firm, PriceWaterhouseCoopers.

Product

Asia Halal Brand Awards
Asia Halal Brand Awards organised by Armani Media Sdn. Bhd. a publisher of Entrepreneur Insight. The awards got nominations from Malaysia, Japan, Taiwan, Indonesia, Thailand, Vietnam, Myanmar and Filipina. This awards to promote halal concept to the world.

{|class="wikitable"
!Year
!Recipient
!Award
!Result
|-
|rowspan="1"|2019
|rowspan="1"|SimplySiti
|rowspan="1"|Best Lipsticks
|
|-

BOSS Awards
BOSS Awards (BA) was organised by the Malaysian Association of ASEAN Young Entrepreneurs (MAAYE) to recognise the outstanding performers in the Malaysian and ASEAN young entrepreneur community. The awards aim to promote excellence, innovation and best practices in business entities.

|-
|rowspan="1"|2016
|rowspan="1"|SimplySiti
|rowspan="1"|People's Choice Awards
|
|-

Go Shop Anniversary Party
Go Shop, a home shopping platform service in Malaysia, enabling Malaysians to shop anytime and was aired at Go Shop Channel on Astro at 118 HD and 120 in Bahasa Malaysia or 303 HD in Mandarin and myFreeview Channel 120 HD. Go Shop had its 5th Anniversary Live Party and they were giving an awards to best-selling product.

{|class="wikitable"
!Year
!Edition
!Recipient
!Award
!Result
|-
|rowspan="1"|2019
|rowspan="1"|5th 
|rowspan="1"|SimplySiti
|rowspan="1"|Best Halal Beauty Product Award (Anugerah Produk Kecantikan Halal Terbaik)
|
|-
|rowspan="1"|2020
|rowspan="1"|6th 
|rowspan="1"|SimplySiti (Argan Wonder)
|rowspan="1"|Best Halal Beauty Product Award (Anugerah Produk Kecantikan Halal Terbaik)
|
|-

Halal Journal Awards
First launched in 2006 by The Halal Journal, one of the main objectives of this award is to give out support to the halal products and services from all over the world. Being the only Malaysian winner, her cosmetic and skincare range, SimplySiti took home the Best Product category.

|-
|rowspan="1"|2010
|rowspan="1"|SimplySiti
|rowspan="1"|Best Halal Product
|
|-

Halfest Awards
Halal Fiest Malaysia or more commonly known as Halfest is an annual five-day trade show first launched in 2011 to promote Malaysian's Small and Medium-sized Business that are certified to be Halal. In 2012, SimplySiti cosmetic range was placed second in the Best Packaging category of Halfest 2012 Awards.     

|-
|rowspan="1"|2012
|rowspan="1"|SimplySiti
|rowspan="1"|Best Packaging
|
|-

Islamic Excellence Awards
The Islamic Excellence Awards 1441H/2020AD was organised by the National Dakwah Council. The awards to recognize the outstanding excellence of individuals and organisations in various fields including academic, corporate, business and social advocacy.

|-
|rowspan="1"|2020
|rowspan="1"|SimplySiti
|rowspan="1"|People's Choice Awards (Jabir Ibn Hayyan Emerging Brand of the Year)
|
|-

Kecantikan Untukumu Cosmopolitan Awards

|-
|rowspan="1"|2010
|rowspan="1"|SimplySiti
|rowspan="1"|The Best Water-Proof Mascara
|
|-

Brandlaureate - SME's Chapter Awards
On 11 January 2011, she received two awards from The BrandLaureate - Small and Medium Enterprises Chapter Awards (The BrandLaureate - SME's Chapter Awards), one for her SimplySiti range, for Most Promising Brand and another one for herself, first time introduced in 2011, The BrandLaureate Tun Dr. Siti Hasmah SME's Women of The Year 2010 which was presented by Tun Dr. Siti Hasmah, wife of Malaysia's fourth Prime Minister, Tun Dr. Mahathir herself.

|-
|rowspan="2"|2011
|rowspan="1"|SimplySiti
|rowspan="1"|Most Promising Brand
|
|-
|rowspan="1"|Herself||The BrandLaureate Tun Dr. Siti Hasmah SME's Women of The Year||
|-
|rowspan="2"|2019
|rowspan="1"|SimplySiti 
|rowspan="1"|The BrandLaureate World Halal Best Brands Award (Cosmetics & Skincare Solutions)
|
|-
|rowspan="1"|Herself||World Halal Brand Leadership Award||
|-

Malaysia Excellence Business Awards
Malaysia Excellence Business Awards (MEBA) organize by Asia Pacific Business Council for Sustainability and Malaysia Digital Chamber of Commerce (MDCC). This awards to recognise accomplishment of individuals and businesses for their sustainable contributions to the nation's economy and progress.

|-
|rowspan="1"|2019
|rowspan="1"|Herself
|rowspan="1"|Celebrity Woman Entrepreneur of the Year
|
|-

Malaysia's Strongest Brands Award
Malaysia's Strongest Brands Award was hosted by Y&R (Young and Rubicam) Malaysia, to recognize the strongest brands in Malaysia across 10 categories including Automative, Banking, Beauty, Food and Beverage, Insurance, Retail Industry and Telecommunications. The winners were chosen based on the BrandAsset Valuator (BAV) Malaysia Study 2016, which looked at merit and detailed data collection of over 900 brands in Malaysia.

|-
|rowspan="1"|2016
|rowspan="1"|SimplySiti
|rowspan="1"|Malaysia's Strongest Brands - BEAUTY
|
|-

Nona Top Beauty Entrepreneur Awards
Nona Top Beauty Entrepreneur Awards organized by Nona magazine is to appreciate and celebrate cosmetic businesswoman that had been successful and become motivate to other women.

|-
|rowspan="1"|2020
|rowspan="1"|Herself
|rowspan="1"|Nona Top Beauty Entrepreneur
|
|-

Shopee Seller Awards
Shopee one of the leading e-commerce platform in Southeast Asia and Taiwan hosted the Shopee Seller Awards where they honor their expanding community of sellers in the Shopee platform.

|-
|rowspan="1"|2018
|rowspan="1"|Herself
|rowspan="1"|People's Celebrity Award
|
|-

UDC Business Awards
On 8 October 2011, she received an award by UDC Business Awards (Universo De Comercio Business Awards) under the category of "UDC Best Upcoming Cosmetic Product" presented by former Prime Minister, Tun Mahathir.

|-
|rowspan="1"|2011
|rowspan="1"|SimplySiti
|rowspan="1"|UDC Best Upcoming Cosmetic Product
|
|-

Watson's Health, Wellness and Beauty Awards

|-
|rowspan="4"|2010
|rowspan="4"|SimplySiti
|rowspan="1"|The Best Halal Launch
|
|-
|The Best Halal BB-Cream
|
|-
|The Best Coverage Face Powder
|
|-
|The Best Exclusive Brand Launch
|
|-
|rowspan="2"|2011
|rowspan="2"|SimplySiti
|rowspan="1"|Best Halal BB-Cream
|
|-
|Best Coverage Face Powder
|
|-
|rowspan="3"|2012
|rowspan="3"|SimplySiti
|rowspan="1"|Best Multi Function Cream
|
|-
|Best New Eau De Parfum
|
|-
|Best Celebrity Brand
|
|-
|rowspan="4"|2013
|rowspan="3"|SimplySiti
|rowspan="1"|Best 2way Powder
|
|-
|Best Eau De Parfum
|
|-
|Best Multi Function Cream
|
|-
|rowspan="1"|Herself 
|Best Entrepreneur of the Year Award 2013
|
|-
|rowspan="3"|2014
|rowspan="3"|SimplySiti
|rowspan="1"|Best Fragrance 
|
|-
|Best Moisturizer Range
|
|-
|Best Experience Differentiation Brand
|
|-
|rowspan="1"|2015
|rowspan="1"|SimplySiti
|rowspan="1"|Best CSR Campaign 
|
|-
|rowspan="1"|2016
|rowspan="1"|SimplySiti
|rowspan="1"|Best CSR Campaign 
|
|-
|rowspan="2"|2018
|rowspan="1"|SimplySiti - Elegant 2 Way Cake Powder 1's (Asst)
|rowspan="1"|Most Wanted - Skin Perfecting Face Range 
|
|-
|rowspan="1"|SimplySiti - Dermagic Beauty Moisturiser 
|rowspan="1"|Most Wanted - Beauty Moisturiser 
|
|-
|rowspan="3"|2019
|rowspan="1"|SimplySiti
|rowspan="1"|Best CSR Campaign 
|
|-
|rowspan="1"|SimplySiti - Elegant Two Way Cake Powder 1's (Asst)
|rowspan="1"|Most Wanted - Skin Perfecting Face Range 
|
|-
|rowspan="1"|SimplySiti - Dermagic Beauty Moisturiser 
|rowspan="1"|Most Wanted - Beauty Moisturiser 
|
|-

Miscellaneous

Accolades from media

Magazines

Anugerah Cosmopolitan Fun Fearless Fabulous (Cosmopolitan Fun Fearless Fabulous Awards)

|-
|rowspan="1"|2011
|rowspan="1"|
|rowspan="1"|Best Female Celebrity
|
|-

Anugerah InTrend 10 Tahun (InTrend Awards)

|-
|rowspan="1"|2015
|rowspan="1"|Herself
|rowspan="1"|Anugerah Sampul Majalah Paling Popular (Most Popular Magazine Cover Awards)
|
|-

Anugerah InTrend Gala 2017 (InTrend Awards)
Anugerah InTrend Gala 2017 is an awards ceremony that was held to celebrate the 12th anniversary of Malaysian magazine InTrend. Over the past 12 years, InTrend magazine presents a variety of interesting information related to fashion, beauty, lifestyle and celebrities all around the world.

|-
|rowspan="1"|2017
|rowspan="1"|Herself
|rowspan="1"|Suri Teladan Inspirasi
|
|-

Anugerah Majalah Wanita (Wanita Magazine Awards)

|-
|rowspan="1"|1999
|rowspan="1"|
|rowspan="1"|Best Cover
|
|-

Anugerah Mangga (Mangga Awards)

|-
|rowspan="1"|1999
|rowspan="1"|
|rowspan="1"|Mangga Sensational Postcard Competition
|
|-

Anugerah Nona Superwonan (Nona Superwoman Awards)
Nona Superwoman Award which carry the theme "Inspirasi Wanita Bermula Di Sini" (Women's Inspiration Begins Here), is an award organised to recognise women in various categories by the Nona magazine.

|-
|rowspan="2"|2018
|rowspan="2"|Herself
|rowspan="1"|Nona Influencer Award
|
|-
|rowspan="1"| Nona Legend Award
|
|-
|rowspan="1"|2020
|rowspan="1"|Herself
|rowspan="1"|Nona Homegrown Award
|
|-

Anugerah Pilihan Pembaca Manja (Manja's Readers' Choice Awards)

|-
|rowspan="3"|2003
|rowspan="3"|
|rowspan="1"|Best Cover
|
|-
|Best Artiste (Female)
|
|-
|Best Global Artiste
|
|-

Anugerah Stail Eh! (Eh!'s Style Awards)

|-
|rowspan="2"|2010
|rowspan="2"|
|rowspan="1"|Celebrity with the Best Achievements
|
|-
|Role Model Celebrity
|
|-
|rowspan="2"|2012
|rowspan="2"|
|rowspan="1"|Best Celebrity Magazine Cover
|
|-
|Celebrity with the Best Achievements
|
|-
|rowspan="2"|2014 
|rowspan="2"|Herself
|Most Photogenic Celebrity
|
|-
|Celebrity Magazine Cover Choice
|
|-
|rowspan="1"|2016 
|rowspan="1"|Herself
|Celebrity Magazine Cover Choice
|
|-
|rowspan="1"|2017 
|rowspan="1"|Herself
|Celebrity with the Best Achievement
|
|-
|rowspan="1"|2019 
|rowspan="1"|Herself
|Celebrity Magazine Cover Choice
|
|-

Anugerah URS (URS Awards)

|-
|rowspan="3"|2001
|rowspan="1"|"Kau Kekasihku"
|rowspan="1"|Favourite Choice for Ballad Song
|
|-
|rowspan="2"| ||Favourite Choice for Teen Artiste|| 
|-
|Favourite Choice for Model
|
|-
|rowspan="3"|2004
|rowspan="3"|
|rowspan="1"|Most Glamorous Teen Star
|
|-
|Most Glamorous Female Artiste
|
|-
|Most Glamorous and Popular Artiste
|
|-

Radio Stations

Anugerah Pilihan Hits Pendengar Radio Malaysia Kuala Lumpur dan Radio Muzik (Radio Malaysia Kuala Lumpur and Radio Muzik Listeners' Hits Choice Award)
First held in 2002, Anugerah Pilihan Hits Pendengar Radio Malaysia Kuala Lumpur dan Radio Muzik is an award ceremony of the collaboration of two radio stations - Radio Malaysia Kuala Lumpur and Radio Muzik where finalists were shortlisted based on their popularity on both stations.

|-
|rowspan="2"|2002
|rowspan="2"|"Bicara Manis Menghiris Kalbu"
|rowspan="1"|Best Performance
|
|-
|Listeners' Hits Choice
|
|-

Anugerah Radio24 BERNAMA (BERNAMA Radio24 Awards)
To celebrate their fifth anniversary, one of BERNAMA's radio stations, Radio24 presented five special awards for five special categories (Media Icon, Sports Icon, Governmental Agency/Department Icon, National Institution Icon and Entertainment Icon).

|-
|rowspan="1"|2012
|rowspan="1"|
|rowspan="1"|Entertainment Icon
|
|-

Carta Radio 3 Shah Alam (Shah Alam's Radio 3 Chart)
The songs chosen for this competition were chosen by fans where 30 songs competed in three main categories and three professional judges will evaluate 10 songs for each category - solo performance, group performance and dangdut songs. Two songs of her compete in this competition, Aku Cinta Padamu and Cindai where Aku Cinta Padamu won Best Performance (Solo) and also as the runner-up for an additional category, Carta Pujaan (Most Demanded Song Chart).

|-
|rowspan="3"|1998
|rowspan="2"|"Aku Cinta Padamu"
|rowspan="1"|Best Performance (Solo)
|
|-
|Most Demanded Song Chart
|
|-
|rowspan="1"|"Cindai" ||Best Performance (Solo)|| 
|-

ERA Corner

|-
|rowspan="1"|2000
|rowspan="1"|
|rowspan="1"|
|
|-

ERA Digital Music Awards
ERA Digital Music Awards is an award ceremony hosted by Malaysia's radio company, Era FM annually and first organized in 2016. The awards recognized the talent of local artists using social media and digital mediums to step in the entertainment world and develop their talents.

|-
|rowspan="2"|2018
|rowspan="1"|Anta Permana
|rowspan="1"|Lagu Paling Viral (Most Viral Song)
|
|-
|rowspan="1"|Herself
|rowspan="1"|Anugerah Khas (Special Award)
|
|-

Radio Era.fm

|-
|rowspan="2"|2015
|rowspan="1"|Herself
|rowspan="1"|Most Singles Played on Radio (Lagu Paling Banyak Dimainkan) 
|
|-
|rowspan="1"|Herself
|rowspan="1"|Era Best Artiste September 2015 (Artis Terbaik Era September 2015) 
|
|-
|rowspan="1"|2018
|rowspan="1"|Herself
|rowspan="1"|Sis Lit ERA November 2018 
|
|-

Top Hot Awards
Top Hot is an award ceremony that made its début in 2017. It was organized by Malaysia's radio station, Hot.fm to recognize the hottest song and highlighted the singer's artistic talent through their popular songs. It is a voting-based awards, where fans are free to vote for their favourites through the awards' official website.

|-
|rowspan="2"|2017
|rowspan="1"|Herself
|rowspan="1"|Penyanyi Wanita Hot (Hot Female Singer)
|
|-
|rowspan="1"|Segala Perasaan
|rowspan="1"|Lagu Hot (Hot Song)
|No. 7
|-
|rowspan="1"|2018
|rowspan="1"|Anta Permana
|rowspan="1"|Lagu Hot (Hot Song)
|No. 1
|-

Volunteer Malaysia Awards
Volunteer Malaysia Awards is an award ceremony that made its debut in 2014. The event was organized by Malaysia's radio station, iM4U fm to recognise and nurture the spirit of volunteerism and social activism through various activities.

|-
|rowspan="1"|2016
|rowspan="1"|Yayasan Nurjiwa (Ops Murni 2015) – Datuk Siti Nurhaliza & Dato’ Sri Khalid Mohamad Jiwa
|rowspan="1"|Personality
|
|-

TV Program

Anugerah Meletop ERA
Anugerah Meletop ERA is an award ceremony that made its début in 2014. It is a collaboration between MeleTOP television programme and Era FM radio station to recognise local Malaysian celebrities "in various platforms including music, radio, television, film, and digital." It is a voting-based awards, where fans are free to vote for their favourites through the awards' official website and short message service (SMS).

|-
|rowspan="5"|2014
|rowspan="3"|Herself
|rowspan="1"|Penyanyi Meletop (Most 'Happening' Singer)
|
|-
|rowspan="1"|Bintang Siber Meletop (Most 'Happening' Cyber Star)
|
|-
|rowspan="1"|Group/Duo Meletop (Most 'Happening' Group/Duo)A
|
|-
|rowspan="1"|"Galau"
|rowspan="2"|Lagu Meletop (Most 'Happening' Song)
|
|-
|rowspan="1"|"Muara Hati"A
|
|-
|rowspan="3"|2015
|rowspan="1"|Herself
|rowspan="1"|Bintang Online Meletop (Most 'Happening' Online Star)
|
|-
|rowspan="2"|"Jaga Dia Untukku"
|rowspan="1"|Penyanyi Meletop (Most 'Happening' Singer)
|
|-
|rowspan="1"|Lagu Meletop (Most 'Happening' Song)
|
|-
|rowspan="4"|2016
|rowspan="3"|Herself
|rowspan="1"|Penyanyi Meletop (Most 'Happening' Singer)
|
|-
|rowspan="1"|Bintang Online Meletop (Most 'Happening' Online Star)
|
|-
|rowspan="1"|Group/Duo Meletop (Most 'Happening' Group/Duo)B
|
|-
|rowspan="1"|"Terbaik Bagimu"
|rowspan="1"|Lagu Meletop (Most 'Happening' Song)
|
|-
|rowspan="4"|2017
|rowspan="2"|Herself
|rowspan="1"|Penyanyi Meletop (Most 'Happening' Singer)
|
|-
|rowspan="1"|Bintang Online Meletop (Most 'Happening' Online Star)
|
|-
|"Dirgahayu"
|rowspan="1"|Group/Duo Meletop (Most 'Happening' Group/Duo)C
|
|-
|rowspan="1"|"Super Spontan All Star (episod Datuk Siti Nurhaliza)"
|rowspan="1"|Program Meletop (Most 'Happening' Program)
|
|-
|rowspan="2"|2018
|rowspan="2"|"Dirgahayu"
|rowspan="1"|Group/Duo Meletop (Most 'Happening' Group/Duo)C
|
|-
|rowspan="1"|Lagu Meletop (Most 'Happening' Song)C
|
|-
|rowspan="2"|2019
|rowspan="1"|"Anta Permana"
|rowspan="1"|Lagu Meletop (Most 'Happening' Song)
|
|-
|rowspan="1"|Herself
|rowspan="1"|Penyanyi Meletop (Most 'Happening' Singer)
|
|-

 A She shared the nomination with Hafiz Suip.
 B She shared the nomination with Cakra Khan.
 C She shared the nomination with Faizal Tahir.

Anugerah Melodi
Anugerah Melodi (Melodi Awards) is a special award ceremony that was held in conjunction with Melodi Raya 2013 (special TV show of Melodi for Eid-ul-Fitr).

Anugerah Parti Cit Cat Azwan (Azwan's Chit Chat Party Awards)

|-
|rowspan="2"|2002
|rowspan="2"|
|rowspan="1"|Best Role Model Artiste
|
|-
|Most Popular Artiste
|
|-

Anugerah Parti HIP TV (HIP TV Party Awards)
It was first organised in 2010 by TV9 for celebrating artistes in non-conventional categories where it received positive and negative feedback from the people in the entertainment industry, where winners were voted by viewers through SMS. In its inaugural event, Siti won one award from one nomination received out of 10 categories available.

|-
|rowspan="1"|2010
|rowspan="1"|
|rowspan="1"|Best Role Model
|
|-

Bella Awards
In 2013, at the inaugural award competition, she beat nine other contenders in the category of "Bella On-Stage Award" based on the votes by fans via SMS and online voting. This is the first ever all-women award ceremony in Malaysia which was held in conjunction of International Women's Day to "celebrate, honour, and recognise the contributions of women in the country".

|-
|rowspan="1"|2013
|rowspan="1"|
|rowspan="1"|On-Stage Award
|
|-

Breakfast With The Stars
In 2006, she was picked as the Best Dressed Artiste in an event by Astro and STAR Movies, Breakfast With The Stars which is in conjunction with the 78th Academy Awards where she won a ticket for two to watch the 49th Grammy Awards.

|-
|rowspan="1"|2006
|rowspan="1"|
|rowspan="1"|Best Dressed Artiste
|
|-

NEF-Awani ICT Awards
NEF-Awani ICT Awards is an award-giving ceremony that was introduced to give recognitions to companies via an integrated media platform. There are two main sections of the awards, which are ICT Awards (by juries) and People's Choice Awards (by voting). In 2013, Siti won the only category that is opened for local celebrities and artistes' - Favourite Local Celebrity@ICT.

TV Shows

Anugerah Seri Angkasa (Seri Angkasa Awards)
An award for television and radio in Malaysia, that was initially triggered by the Ministry of Information Malaysia in 1972. In early involvement, the awards only for publishing radio programs and publications of Televisyen Radio Malaysia. However starting in 2004, the ministry has opened up opportunities to others host broadcasters to participate.

Anugerah Skrin
An annual event that was launched in 1995 which was organised by TV3. The awards to recognised the best Malaysia's television program, film, actors, personalities and productions. In early involvement, the awards only for publishing television programs and publications of TV3. However starting in 2006, TV3 has opened up opportunities to others host broadcasters to participate.

Malam Throwbaek Drama
Malam Throwbaek Drama (Throwbaek Drama Night) made its debut in 2017. It was organised by H!Live (television programme) and Astro (TV station) to give appreciation to those involved and committed into the success of Astro's drama. There are about eleven categories, eight categories are based on 50% online votes and 50% of Astro's juries.

Accolades from organisations

Anugerah Persatuan Perlindungan Hak Cipta Karyawan Muzik (Music Authors Copyright Protection Awards)
Anugerah Persatuan Perlindungan Hak Cipta Karyawan Muzik, or commonly known as MACP, is an event that was first launched in 1996, to recognise the best lyricists and music composers based on their royalty collections and acknowledging their contributions to the music industry. The royalty collections are based on the amount received from airing or broadcasting songs made by them through radio airwaves, television shows and even public performances.

|-
|rowspan="1"|2002
|rowspan="1"|"Pandang-Pandang Jeling-Jeling"duet with Tan Sri S.M. Salim
|rowspan="1"|Most Performed Malay Song
|
|-
|rowspan="1"|2004
|rowspan="1"|
|rowspan="1"|Potential Young Lyricist
|
|-
|rowspan="2"|2007
|rowspan="1"|"Cindai"
|rowspan="1"|Top 90's Favourite
|
|-
|rowspan="1"|"Pandang-Pandang Jeling-Jeling"duet with Tan Sri S.M. Salim||Latest Popular Choice||
|-
|rowspan="2"|2008
|rowspan="2"|"Hati"
|rowspan="1"|Best Song
|
|-
|Best Musical Arrangement
|
|-
|rowspan="1"|2009
|rowspan="1"|"Aku Cinta Padamu"
|rowspan="1"|Most Performed Malay Song
|
|-

Anugerah RIM (RIM's Awards)

|-
|rowspan="1"|1998
|rowspan="1"|Adiwarna
|rowspan="1"|Best Achievement for Malay Album
|
|-

Anugerah Festival Filem Malaysia (Malaysian Film Festival Awards)
In 2008, her song that was used as a theme song for film, 1957: Hati Malaya won the award for the category of Lagu Tema Asal Terbaik (Best Original Theme Song) from Anugerah Festival Filem Malaysia ke-21 (21st Malaysian Film Festival) where this song was included in her twelfth album, Hadiah Daripada Hati.

|-
|rowspan="1"|2008
|rowspan="1"|"Hati"
|rowspan="1"|Best Original Theme Song
|
|-

Anugerah Oskar
Not to be confused with Oscars of the Academy Awards, Anugerah Oskar is a Malaysian award that recognises the technical aspects of a film.

JOOX Malaysia Top Music Awards
JOOX Malaysia Top Music Awards (Mid Year 2020) organized by JOOX Malaysia for the first time is part of the High5JOOX campaign party for JOOX's 5th anniversary in Malaysia. All winner in each categories were choose based on fan voting. Later in January 2021, Joox announced the winners for 2020 JOOX Top Music Awards. The awards consist of 3 categories Most Popular Awards (Votes), Year End 2020 (streaming from July 1 to December 31, 2020) and Full Year 2020 (streaming counts from January 1 to December 31, 2020).

Universal Music Malaysia Awards
Legend Award trophy was presented to Siti Nurhaliza for her latest achievements in collaboration with Universal Music Malaysia for her successful album physical and digital sale for Fragmen (3× Platinum), Unplugged (Gold) and SimetriSiti (Gold); digital sale for single Anta Permana (11× Platinum), Comel Pipi Merah (4× Platinum), Cinta Syurga duet Khai Bahar (Gold) and Mikraj Cinta (4× Platinum); and being named the most streamed local artiste on Spotify for year 2017 and 2018. This award was presented by Kenny Ong, managing director of the Universal Music Group for Malaysia, Singapore and Indochina.

|-
|rowspan="1"|2019
|rowspan="1"|Herself
|rowspan="1"|Universal Music Legend Award
|
|-

Yonder Music
Yonder Music is a digital music service that can access millions of song to download and play. In conjunction with its 1st anniversary in Malaysia, Yonder Music had given an appreciation to Siti Nurhaliza.

|-
|rowspan="1"|2016
|rowspan="1"|Herself
|rowspan="1"|Hear Forever
|
|-

YouChoose Video Music Awards
First organized in 2017, YouChoose Video Music Awards is an award to acknowledge and honor the greatest music videos of the year and the winner were choose by the fans, where fans are free to vote their favourites through the awards' official website. These awards organized by Universal Music Malaysia a recording company.

|-
|rowspan="3"|2017
|rowspan="1"|"Segala Perasaan"
|rowspan="1"|Video Muzik Paling Jiwang
|
|-
|rowspan="2"|"Mikraj Cinta"
|rowspan="1"|Video Musik Terbaik
|
|-
|rowspan="1"|Artist Terbaik 2017
|
|-

Appointments and recognitions

Appointments
Government campaigns
 Ambassador of Budi Bahasa dan Nilai-Nilai Murni (2006)
 Ambassador of Gegar U! Warna Warna Malaysiaku (2007)
 Ambassador 'Living With Breast Cancer' (2011)
 Tourism Advisors Of Malaysia (2015)
 Entrepreneur's Iconic Vendeur Festival - Perbadanan Pembangunan Perdagangan Luar Malaysia (MATRADE) (2016)
 Celebrity Cycling Women Icon (Ikon Selebriti Kayuhan Wanita) - Dasar Komuniti Negara, Kementerian Perumahan dan Kerajaan Tempatan (2019)
 MUN Icon (Ikon Minggu Usahawan Nasional) - Kementeri Pembangunan Usahawan (2019)

Products
 Model/Spokesperson of Maybelline (1999–2003)
 Model of Mitsubishi Trium (2000)
 Model of and Pepsi and Pepsi Blue (2000–2002)
 Model of Nippon Wiper Blade(2001)
 Ambassador of TM Net (2002-2003)
 Ambassador of Minolta DiMAGE Malaysia (2003)
 Ambassador of Maxis-Hotlink (2004)
 Ambassador of IT Samsung Products Malaysia (2004)
 Ambassador of Elegance Tiara Collection (2006)
 Ambassador of Olay Total Effects (2006-2008)
 Ambassador of SHINE Pantene Pro-V (2006-2008)
 Ambassador of Pantene (2007)
 Ambassador/Spokesperson of Sity Avita Sdn. Bhd (2009)
 Ambassador of Ariani (Ikon Ariani) (2014)
 Ambassador of Yonder Music Malaysia (2015)
 Ambassador of Vivo V5, Vivo Malaysia (2016)
 Ambassador of VisionBody Malaysia (2017)
 Ambassador of CryoCord Malaysia (2018)
 Ambassador of Vantage (2018)
 Ambassador of Vivo V15 Pro, Vivo Malaysia (2019)
 Ambassador of Vivo V17 Pro, Vivo Malaysia (2019)
 Ambassador of Cuckoo (2020-Present)
 Ambassador of Farm Fresh (2022-Present)

University and organisations
 Ambassador of Goodwill Malaysian Red Crescent Society (1999–2001)
 Ambassador of First ASEAN ParaGames (2001)
 Ambassador of "With All Our Hearts’ Charity Fund" Jusco and Æon (2002–2009)
 Ambassador of National Anti-Drug Campaign (2006)
 Ambassador of Suara Universiti (2007)
 International Advisor of Performing Arts of Limkokwing University (2008)
 Ambassador of the Malaysian AIDS Foundation (2012–present)
 Board of Trustees of Yayasan PINTAR (2017)
 Board of Directors of Akademi Seni Dan Warisan (Aswara) (2018)
 Ambassador of Binary University (2022)

Recognitions and honours
Royal knighthood and titles
 Darjah Kebesaran Sultan Ahmad Shah Pahang Yang Amat Di Mulia - Peringkat Keempat Ahli Ahmad Shah Pahang (AAP) - by Sultan Ahmad Shah of Pahang
 Darjah Seri Paduka Mahkota Perak - Pangkat Ketiga - Paduka Mahkota Perak (PMP) - by Sultan Azlan Shah of Perak (2001)
 Darjah Yang Mulia Setia Mahkota - Darjah Pangkat Ketiga - Johan Setia Mahkota (JSM) - by Yang di-Pertuan Agong (at that time) Tuanku Syed Sirajuddin of Perlis (2003)
 Darjah Kebesaran Sultan Ahmad Shah Pahang Yang Amat Di Mulia - Peringkat Ketiga Setia Ahmad Shah Pahang (SAP) - by Sultan Ahmad Shah of Pahang (2005)
 Darjah Kebesaran Mahkota Pahang Yang Amat Mulia - Peringkat Kedua Darjah Indera Mahkota Pahang (DIMP) - by Sultan Ahmad Shah of Pahang (2006)
 Darjah Kebesaran Sultan Ahmad Shah Pahang Yang Amat Di Mulia - Peringkat Pertama Sri Sultan Ahmad Shah Pahang (SSAP) - by Tengku Abdullah Sultan Shah, Pemangku Raja Pahang (2017)

Government-based
 Malaysia's Stamp Princess by Pos Malaysia - For receiving tens of thousands of fan letters each year.
 Anugerah Pelabur Bijaksana (1999) - Permodalan Nasional Berhad (PNB)
 Anugerah Personaliti Terbaik (2000) - Papita (Persatuan Penyanyi-penyanyi Tanah Air (Local Singers Association))
 Anugerah Puteri Remaja (2002) - Puteri UMNO
 Anugerah Jasamu Dikenang MAYC (2003)
 Anugerah Bintang Seniman (2004) - Anugerah Perdana Bintang Seniman
 Anugerah Srikandi Seni (2005) - UMNO Bahagian Maran, Pahang
 Tokoh Karyawan Usahawan Muda (2005) - Universiti Sains Malaysia
 Anugerah Kesatria Puteri Kesenian (2012) - Puteri UMNO
 Pingat Jasa Bakti (PJB) (2016) - Lembaga Kesedaran Pencegahan Jenayah Malaysia
 Tourism Icon of The Year (Celebrity) (2018) - Malaysia Tourism Council Gold Awards

Non Government-based
 The Most Successful Talent In Malaysia Music Industry - Stars of Universe of Corum (2002)
 The Outstanding Young Malaysian Award - Cultural Achievement - Junior Chamber International Malaysia (2003)
 Malaysian Personality of the Year Award - BestBrands Award (2005)
 Malaysia Professional Artiste Award - Anugerah Kecemerlangan Balai Ikhtisas Malaysia (2008)
 YOUTH'10 Icon - Malaysia's Youth Festival (2010)
 Anugerah Wanita Inspirasi (Inspirational Woman Award) - Anugerah Kasih Ikatan Setia Malaysia-Indonesia (2011)
 Anugerah 5tars (5star Award) - 5star-5 Designers under 4 differences labels (2012)
 Anugerah Kemanusiaan (Humanity Award) - Majlis Perundingan Islam Malaysia MAPIM (2013)
 Her World Young Achiever 2013 - HerWorld Women Awards (2014)
 National Icon - Inaugural Malaysia Women Of Excellence Awards (2014)
 Jewel of Muslim World - Jewels Of Muslim World Awards (2014)
 Asian Music Legend - Top Asia Corporate Ball (2014)
 Anugerah Srikandi Negara - Anugerah Tokoh Srikandi Negara, Gabungan Pelajar Melayu Semenanjung Malaysia GPMS (2014)
 Celebrity Entrepreneur Of The Year - SME & Entrepreneurship Business Award:Premier Edition 2017–2018 (2017)
 The 100 Most Influential Young Entrepreneurs (100MIYE) - Entrepreneur Insight (2018)
 The 100 Most Influential Young Entrepreneurs - Entrepreneur Insight (2019) 
 Celebrity Entrepreneur Lifetime Achievement Award 2019 - The 13th Asian Academy of Management International Conference 2019 at Universiti Sains Malaysia (2019)

The Malaysia Book of Records
 Most Awards Won Artiste - 53 awards (2001)
 Most Awards Won Artiste - 112 awards (2004)
 First Malaysian artiste to perform a solo concert at Royal Albert Hall (2005)
 Biggest Participation in Skin Transformation event in One Day – Given to her cosmetic company, SimplySiti (2013)
 Icon Of Malaysia Award (2014)

Other Recognitions/Honorifics 
 "Voice of Asia"  
 "Asia's Celine Dion"
 Second "Asia's Best Musical Artiste" by MTV Asia (2005)
 Second "Biggest Asian Artiste" by Channel V (2005)
 Top 20 "Celebrity Weddings" by Yahoo! Buzz (2006)
 She was named as one of Asia's Idol by Asia News Network (2008)
 Top 10 "Influential Celebrities in Malaysia: Stars with the X-factor Sizzle" by asiaonenews (2009) 
 Third "Most Powerful Celebrity Couple in Asia", given to Siti and her husband by E! News Asia (2010)
 Top of the pops by Southeast Asia Globe (2010)
 Top 5 "Asia's Most High-Profile Weddings" by CNBC (2011)
 No. 7 Malaysia's Top 10 Malay Tracks on Spotify 2014 for song 'Jaga Dia Untukku' (2014)
 The Muslim 500 - The World's 500 Most Influential Muslims 2016 (2015)
 Top five: Pop-tastic songbirds by Southeast Asia Globe (2015)
 Spotify's Top 5 Top Asian Artists in Malaysia (2015)
 Top 3 "Malaysia's Most Admired Women" by YouGov Asia-Pacific (2016)
 The Muslim 500 - The World's 500 Most Influential Muslims 2017 (2016)
 The Muslim 500 - The World's 500 Most Influential Muslims 2018 (2017)
 No. 1 Spotify's Most Streamed Local Artiste of The Year (2017)
 No. 1 (Women) World's Most Admired – Malaysia by YouGov UK (2018)
 No. 1 Top Local Female Artists - Spotify's 5 Years in Malaysia (2018)
 The 10th Anniversary Edition, The Muslim 500 - The World's 500 Most Influential Muslims 2019 (2018)
 No. 1 Spotify's Most Streamed Local Artiste of The Year (2018)
 Artiste of the Month-December, 2018 - Hitz Minggu Ini by RIA897.FM Singapore Radio Network (2018)
 No. 1 (Women) World's Most Admired – Malaysia by YouGov UK (2019)
 The Muslim 500 - The World's 500 Most Influential Muslims 2020 (2019)
 Top 3 Spotify's Most Streamed Local Artiste of The Year (2019)
 No. 2 Suria's Most Viewed Social Media Videos of 2019 - Mediacorp Suria-Singapore (2019)
 Top 3 Most Streamed Female Artists - JOOX Malaysia (2019)
 No. 1 at Top 30 Local Artists - JOOX Malaysia (2019)
 No. 1 (Women) World's Most Admired – Malaysia by YouGov UK (2020)
 No. 1 Spotify's Most Streamed Local Artiste of The Year (2020)
 The Muslim 500 - The World's 500 Most Influential Muslims 2021 (2020)
 Forbes Asia's 100 Digital Stars - Asia-Pacific's Most Influential Celebrities on Social Media by Forbes Asia (2020)
 No. 1 at JOOX 2020: Top 30 Artis Lokal (Top 30 Local Artists) - JOOX Malaysia (2020)
 No. 13 Aku Bidadari Syurgamu at JOOX 2020: Top 50 Lagu Lokal (Top 50 Local Songs) - JOOX Malaysia (2020)
 No. 43 Kesilapanku Keegoanmu at JOOX 2020: Top 100 Lagu Karaoke (Top 100 Karaoke Songs) - JOOX Malaysia (2020)
 No. 60 Anta Permana at JOOX 2020: Top 100 Lagu Karaoke (Top 100 Karaoke Songs) - JOOX Malaysia (2020) 
 No. 95 Bukan Cinta Biasa at JOOX 2020: Top 100 Lagu Karaoke (Top 100 Karaoke Songs) - JOOX Malaysia (2020)
 No. 97 Jerat Percintaan at JOOX 2020: Top 100 Lagu Karaoke (Top 100 Karaoke Songs) - JOOX Malaysia (2020)
 No. 100 Kisah Kuinginkan at JOOX 2020: Top 100 Lagu Karaoke (Top 100 Karaoke Songs) - JOOX Malaysia (2020)
 N0. 1 Choice Successful Artist #Gempak TOP2020 (Artis Sukses 2020 Pilihan #Gempak TOP2020) - #Gempak (2020)
 N0. 5 Aku Bidadari Syurgamua - Choice Song #Gempak TOP2020 (Lagu Pilihan #Gempak TOP2020) - #Gempak (2020)
 No. 3 Personalities Most Prominent Throughout 2020 (Personaliti Paling Menyerlah Sepanjang 2020) listed by Astro AWANI (2020) 
Walk Of Fame - 2019 Walk Of Fame Stars
Artis Tergempak - GEMPAK Most Wanted 2020
 Artiste Of The Year - Muzik Kita (2020)
Celebrity Entrepreneur Of The Year (Beauty & Health) - 2021
Passionate Icon Of The Year - Des Prix Infinitus Media Leadership Excellence Awards 2020–2021
Asia's Most Influential - Tatler Asia
Entrepreneurs Of The Year - SEBA
Able Award 2021

Footnotes
 Note 1:  From those outlined inside the infobox only.

References

Lists of awards received by Malaysian musician
Awards